Ezra is a figure from the Hebrew Bible who was a major Jewish leader during the Return to Zion. Ezra-Nehemiah, and the Chronicles, are attributed to him.

Ezra may also refer to:

People
 Ezra (name), including a list of people with either the given name or surname
They include:
 George Ezra, stage name of British singer-songwriter George Ezra Barnett (born 1993)
 Ezra Charles, stage name of American jump blues pianist Charles Helpinstill Jr. (born 1944)
 Ezra Miller, an American actor
 Ezra Pound, an American critic and poet

Arts and entertainment
 Ezra (2007 film), a Nigerian film
 Ezra (2017 film), an Indian film
 Ezra the Mad, a character in the Night Angel Trilogy
 Ezra Bridger, a character on the TV series Star Wars Rebels
 Ezra Fitzgerald, a character in the American TV series Pretty Little Liars as well as the books of the same title by Sara Shepard
 Ezra, a character in CBeebies TV show JoJo & Gran Gran
 Ezra Banks, a character in The InBESTigators, an Australian children's programme

Places
 Ezra, Alabama, United States, an unincorporated community northwest of Bessemer, Alabama
 Ezra, Tel Aviv, Israel, a neighborhood - see Neighborhoods of Tel Aviv

Other uses
 Ezra Cup, an Indian polo tournament

See also
 Ezrah, a minor Biblical figure
 Esdras, Greek or Latin spelling of Ezra
 ESRA (disambiguation), acronym
 Erza (disambiguation)